Ktery may refer to two villages within Kutno County, Łódź Voivodeship, in central Poland:

 Ktery A
 Ktery B